School of Fish is the debut studio album by the band of the same name. It was released in April 1991.

Promotion
The album was supported by the single "3 Strange Days" which peaked at #12 on the Mainstream Rock Tracks. The single included two non-album tracks: the original composition "Where Have I Been" and the cover of Prince's "Let's Pretend We're Married".

Track listing
All tracks written by Josh Clayton-Felt & Michael Ward, except where noted.
 "Intro" - 1:42
 "3 Strange Days" - 5:12
 "Talk Like Strangers" - 3:37
 "Deep End" - 4:54
 "King Of The Dollar" (Felt/Jagger/Richards/Ward) - 2:47
 "Speechless" - 4:56
 "Wrong" - 4:28
 "Rose Colored Glasses" - 3:43
 "Under The Microscope" - 4:34
 "Fell" - 2:50
 "Euphoria" - 5:45

Personnel

School of Fish
 Josh Clayton-Felt - vocals, guitar, drum box
 Michael Ward - lead guitar, background vocals, drum box
 M.P. - drums
 Dominic Nardini - bass guitar

Production
Produced by John Porter 
Engineered by Dave "Death" Pine, assisted by Ken Paulakovich and Lee Manning
Mixed at Chapel Studio
Art direction – Tommy Steele
Design – Heather Van Haaften
Photography – Dennis Keeley
Management
A&R Direction - Alison Donald
A&R Coordination - Valerie Pack
Legal representation - Jon Blaufarb

Charts

References

School of Fish albums
1991 debut albums
Capitol Records albums